Gazprom–RusVelo, a part of the Russian Global Cycling Project and sponsored by Gazprom, is a Russian road and track cycling team that suspended its activities in 2022. It was founded in late 2011 and granted UCI Professional Continental status. For its first season 2012 the team signed several ex- riders along with a few ones from Continental Team .

RusVelo initially included both men's and women's rosters. The directors are Viatcheslav Ekimov, Oleg Grishkin, Egon van Kessel from the Netherlands, and Australian Henk Vogels. The General Manager was Heiko Salzwedel.

In March 2022 the team's licence was revoked by the UCI following the 2022 Russian invasion of Ukraine. On the same day bicycle manufacturer Look, and wheel provider Corima, both announced the cancellation of their sponsorship of the team. Later that month, the team suspended its activities.

Team history
In December 2012, RusVelo's request for a Professional Continental licence for the 2013 season was denied pending a review. The squad were ultimately awarded a Professional Continental licence on 9 January 2013.

Doping
In 2013 the team endured a spate of doping positives. In March Valery Kaikov for the, cancer-causing, banned compound GW501516 (Endurobol). This was the first recorded positive for Endurobol. In June at the 2013 Russian National Championships Roman Maikin and Artem Ovechkin tested positive for Fenoterol and received a six-month ban Andrey Solomennikov tested positive for asthma medication and received a six-month suspension as well. As a result, the team auto-suspended itself from competition. In June 2015, the team received their fifth positive in less than two years when Petr Ignatenko tested positive for human growth hormone (hGH) in an out-of-competition test on April 8, this is only the second hGH positive since Patrick Sinkewitz returned an adverse analytical finding for the substance.

Team roster

Major wins

National champions 

2013
 Russian National Time Trial, Ilnur Zakarin
2015
 Russian National Time Trial, Artem Ovechkin
2017 
 Russian National Road Race, Alexander Porsev
2019
 Russian National Road Race, Alexander Vlasov
2021
 Russian National Road Race, Artem Nych

References

External links

Cycling teams based in Russia
UCI Professional Continental teams
Cycling teams established in 2012
2012 establishments in Russia